Zimnowoda  is a village in the administrative district of Gmina Bogoria, within Staszów County, Świętokrzyskie Voivodeship, in south-central Poland.

The village has a population of  236.

Demography 
According to the 2002 Poland census, there were 222 people residing in Zimnowoda village, of whom 50% were male and 50% were female. In the village, the population was spread out, with 24.8% under the age of 18, 36.5% from 18 to 44, 21.2% from 45 to 64, and 17.6% who were 65 years of age or older.
 Figure 1. Population pyramid of village in 2002 — by age group and sex

References

Villages in Staszów County